Nicolás Berardo (born July 26, 1990) is an Argentine-born Chilean footballer who currently plays, as a left back, for Chilean Primera División club Coquimbo Unido.

Career

In 2013, he was champion with Unión Española after achieved the Torneo Transición.

On August 3, 2017, he moved to Coquimbo Unido from the Primera B de Chile. After Coquimbo Unido was relegated to Primera B, he joined Palestino.

Honours

Club
Argentinos Juniors
 Argentine Primera División (1): 2010–C

Unión Española
 Chilean Primera División (1): 2013–T
 Supercopa de Chile (1): 2013

Coquimbo Unido
 Primera B de Chile (1): 2018

References

External links
 
 Berardo at Football-Lineups
 

1990 births
Living people
Argentine people of Italian descent
Argentine footballers
Argentine expatriate footballers
Argentinos Juniors footballers
Unión Española footballers
Coquimbo Unido footballers
Club Deportivo Palestino footballers
Argentine Primera División players
Chilean Primera División players
Primera B de Chile players
Expatriate footballers in Chile
Argentine expatriate sportspeople in Chile
Association football defenders
Argentine emigrants to Chile
Naturalized citizens of Chile